Inuuvunga: I Am Inuk, I Am Alive is a joint 58-minute 2004 documentary about Inuit high school students in Inukjuak, Nunavik (Quebec), documenting their final year in the high school.

Filmed in Inuktitut with subtitles in English, it was produced by National Film Board of Canada (NFB), (including Sally Bochner as executive producer and Pierre Lapointe as producer) and chronicles the students' efforts to learn how to come of age in a rapidly changing culture, while coping with issues like suicide and substance abuse.

NFB dispatched EyeSteelFilm directors Daniel Cross, Mila Aung-Thwin, Brett Gaylor to the Inukjuak – Innalik School in Nunavik, Quebec, to teach the students the skills of filming. The students who took part in the filming were Bobby Echalook, Caroline Ningiuk, Dora Ohaituk (herself a victim of suicide in 2004), Laura Iqaluk, Linus Kasudluak, Rita-Lucy Ohaituk, Sarah Idlout and Willia Ningeok.

Synopsis
In the remote northern town of Inukjuak, Nunavik, 8 Inuit teenagers are given cameras to document their final year of high school. The film chronicles their efforts to learn how to come of age in a rapidly changing culture, while coping with issues like suicide and substance abuse.

Hockey, hip hop, hunting and midnight Ski-Doo rides. Welcome to Inukjuak. It's the final year of high school for eight teens at Innalik school in this remote town in northern Quebec. These eight students, through the initiative of NFB, have been selected to document this pivotal year of their lives. To teach them some basics, the NFB has dispatched filmmakers Daniel Cross and Mila Aung-Thwin. The result of their collaboration is Inuuvunga, a vibrant and utterly contemporary view of life in Canada's North. The students use their new film skills to address a broad range of issues, from the widening communication gap with their elders to the loss of their peers to suicide. Throughout, they reveal an unusual and fascinating mix of southern and northern cultures. Seamless and startling, Inuuvunga paints a rich portrait of coming of age in an Inuit town and helps to dispel the myths of northern isolation and desolation. Instead, we discover a place where hope and strength overcome struggle.

References

External links
Watch Inuuvunga: I Am Inuk, I Am Alive at NFB.ca (Requires Adobe Flash)
EyeSteelFilm page about Inuuvunga: I Am Inuk, I Am alive
Inukjuak - Innalik School website

2004 films
EyeSteelFilm films
Canadian documentary films
National Film Board of Canada documentaries
Quebec films
Inuktitut-language films
Documentary films about the Arctic
Canadian student films
2004 documentary films
Films directed by Brett Gaylor
Films directed by Daniel Cross
Documentary films about Inuit in Canada
Works about Quebec
2000s Canadian films
Nunavik